Psalm 37 is the 37th psalm of the Book of Psalms, beginning in English in the King James Version: "Fret not thyself because of evildoers, neither be thou envious against the workers of iniquity". The Book of Psalms is part of the third section of the Hebrew Bible, and a book of the Christian Old Testament. In the slightly different numbering system used in the Greek Septuagint and Latin Vulgate translations of the Bible, this psalm is Psalm 36. In Latin, it is known as Noli aemulari in malignantibus.  The psalm has the form of an acrostic Hebrew poem, and is thought to have been written by David in his old age.

The psalm forms a regular part of Jewish, Catholic, Lutheran, Anglican and other Protestant liturgies. It has inspired hymns based on it, and has been set to music, by Baroque composers such as Heinrich Schütz as well as romantic composers such as Anton Bruckner.

Text

Hebrew Bible version 
The following is the Hebrew text of Psalm 37:

King James Version 
 Fret not thyself because of evildoers, neither be thou envious against the workers of iniquity.
 For they shall soon be cut down like the grass, and wither as the green herb.
 Trust in the LORD, and do good; so shalt thou dwell in the land, and verily thou shalt be fed.
 Delight thyself also in the LORD: and he shall give thee the desires of thine heart.
 Commit thy way unto the LORD; trust also in him; and he shall bring it to pass.
 And he shall bring forth thy righteousness as the light, and thy judgment as the noonday.
 Rest in the LORD, and wait patiently for him: fret not thyself because of him who prospereth in his way, because of the man who bringeth wicked devices to pass.
 Cease from anger, and forsake wrath: fret not thyself in any wise to do evil.
 For evildoers shall be cut off: but those that wait upon the LORD, they shall inherit the earth.
 For yet a little while, and the wicked shall not be: yea, thou shalt diligently consider his place, and it shall not be.
 But the meek shall inherit the earth; and shall delight themselves in the abundance of peace.
 The wicked plotteth against the just, and gnasheth upon him with his teeth.
 The LORD shall laugh at him: for he seeth that his day is coming.
 The wicked have drawn out the sword, and have bent their bow, to cast down the poor and needy, and to slay such as be of upright conversation.
 Their sword shall enter into their own heart, and their bows shall be broken.
 A little that a righteous man hath is better than the riches of many wicked.
 For the arms of the wicked shall be broken: but the LORD upholdeth the righteous.
 The LORD knoweth the days of the upright: and their inheritance shall be for ever.
 They shall not be ashamed in the evil time: and in the days of famine they shall be satisfied.
 But the wicked shall perish, and the enemies of the LORD shall be as the fat of lambs: they shall consume; into smoke shall they consume away.
 The wicked borroweth, and payeth not again: but the righteous sheweth mercy, and giveth.
 For such as be blessed of him shall inherit the earth; and they that be cursed of him shall be cut off.
 The steps of a good man are ordered by the LORD: and he delighteth in his way.
 Though he fall, he shall not be utterly cast down: for the LORD upholdeth him with his hand.
 I have been young, and now am old; yet have I not seen the righteous forsaken, nor his seed begging bread.
 He is ever merciful, and lendeth; and his seed is blessed.
 Depart from evil, and do good; and dwell for evermore.
 For the LORD loveth judgment, and forsaketh not his saints; they are preserved for ever: but the seed of the wicked shall be cut off.
 The righteous shall inherit the land, and dwell therein for ever.
 The mouth of the righteous speaketh wisdom, and his tongue talketh of judgment.
 The law of his God is in his heart; none of his steps shall slide.
 The wicked watcheth the righteous, and seeketh to slay him.
 The LORD will not leave him in his hand, nor condemn him when he is judged.
 Wait on the LORD, and keep his way, and he shall exalt thee to inherit the land: when the wicked are cut off, thou shalt see it.
 I have seen the wicked in great power, and spreading himself like a green bay tree.
 Yet he passed away, and, lo, he was not: yea, I sought him, but he could not be found.
 Mark the perfect man, and behold the upright: for the end of that man is peace.
 But the transgressors shall be destroyed together: the end of the wicked shall be cut off.
 But the salvation of the righteous is of the LORD: he is their strength in the time of trouble.
 And the LORD shall help them, and deliver them: he shall deliver them from the wicked, and save them, because they trust in him.

Interpretation 
Psalm 37 is a response to the problem of evil, which the Old Testament often expresses as a question: why do the wicked prosper and the good suffer? In the New American Bible, Revised Edition, published by the Catholic Church in the USA, the psalm answers that this situation is only temporary: God will reverse things, rewarding the good and punishing the wicked here on earth. This interpretation is shared by Protestants. Matthew Henry calls it David's call to patience and confidence in God by the state of the godly and the wicked. Charles Spurgeon calls it "the great riddle of the prosperity of the wicked and the affliction of the righteous".

It is written as an acrostic and divided into discrete sections. Each section ends with God's resolution of the question.

The psalm has also been understood as a prayer of the persecuted who has taken refuge in the temple or figuratively of refuge in God. The psalm concludes with a plea to God for those who honor him, to bless them with his justice and to protect them from the snares of the wicked.

The theme of inheriting the land reoccurs five times in this Psalm (in verses 9, 11, 22, 29 and 34). Prior to this in Psalm 25:13 the rich as also said to inherit the land as well. Albert Barnes also compares the wicked being cut off in psalm 37:2 and 10 with the wicked being cut off in Psalm 73:27.

Uses

Judaism
Verse 21 is found in Pirkei Avot Chapter 2, no. 14. 
Verse 25 is part of the final paragraph of Birkat Hamazon.

New Testament
The Beatitudes in the New Testament are influenced by this psalm. Verse 11 was cited by Jesus Christ in Matthew 5:5. The original reads,
 But the meek shall inherit the earth; 
 and shall delight themselves in the abundance of peace.

Islam
 "The righteous shall inherit the land, and dwell therein for ever" is referenced in the Qur'an:

Book of Common Prayer
In the Church of England's Book of Common Prayer, this psalm is appointed to be read on the evening of the seventh day of the month.

Musical settings 
Heinrich Schütz wrote a setting of a paraphrase of Psalm 37 in German, "Erzürn dich nicht so sehre", SWV 134, for the Becker Psalter, published first in 1628. Verses 30–31 in Latin were set by Anton Bruckner as "Os Justi" in 1879.

See also 
 Beatitudes
 Matthew 5

References

External links

 
 
  in Hebrew and English - Mechon-mamre
 Text of Psalm 37 according to the 1928 Psalter
 Of David. / Do not be provoked by evildoers; do not envy those who do wrong. text and footnotes, usccb.org United States Conference of Catholic Bishops
 Psalm 37:1 introduction and text, biblestudytools.com
 Psalm 37 – "Wisdom Over Worry" enduringword.com
 Psalm 37 / Refrain: The salvation of the righteous comes from the Lord. Church of England
 Psalm 37 at biblegateway.com
 Hymns for Psalm 37 hymnary.org

037
Works attributed to David